Emperor Hulkling (Dorrek VIII, also known as Theodore Rufus "Teddy" Kaplan-Altman) is a fictional superhero appearing in American comic books published by Marvel Comics. The character has been depicted as a member of the Young Avengers, a team of superheroes in the Marvel Universe. Hulkling's character is patterned on the Hulk, with shapeshifting abilities that go far beyond the ability to mimic the Hulk, and superhuman strength. He is known for his relationship with fellow Young Avenger Wiccan, notable for being one of the highest-profile gay relationships in comics.

Publication history
Hulkling was created by writer Allan Heinberg and artist Jim Cheung and first was in Young Avengers #1 (April 2005) along with other teenage heroes patterned after founding Avengers members.

Hulkling was originally planned to be a female character. According to Tom Brevoort, "Originally, Allan pitched Hulkling as a female character using her shape-changing abilities to pose as a man. I suspect this was as close as Allan felt he could get to depicting an openly gay relationship in a Marvel comic. But as we got underway... he started to have second thoughts and approached me about maintaining Hulkling and Wiccan as two involved male characters".

He was also featured in Civil War: Young Avengers/Runaways and appeared in the Civil War crossover event. Hulkling then appeared in the 2013 Young Avengers series by Kieron Gillen and Jamie McKelvie, and appeared with Wiccan in New Avengers as part of All-New All-Different Marvel.

Most recently, Hulkling has been a key player in Empyre, Marvel's summer 2020 crossover event. A one-shot, Lords of Empyre: Emperor Hulkling, written by Chip Zdarsky and queer author Anthony Oliveira, fills in some of the backstory of how Hulkling was called on to become emperor and his relationship with Wiccan.

In April 2021, Hulkling and Wiccan became members of the Guardians of the Galaxy, beginning with Guardians of the Galaxy #13 by Al Ewing, Juan Frigeri, and Brett Booth.

Fictional character biography

Young Avengers Vol. 1
In his first appearance, little is revealed about Hulkling except for the fact he is raised by a single mother. All this changes when the shapeshifting extraterrestrial known as the Super-Skrull appears, stating that Teddy is a Skrull. The Super-Skrull is surprised to learn that Teddy has super strength and wonders "perhaps the rumors about his father are true." The Super Skrull follows the Young Avengers to Wiccan's house, where Teddy's mother is waiting for him. The Super-Skrull releases a device designed to turn Teddy into his true form in an attempt to prove his Skrull heritage. While the device does not change Teddy's physical appearance, Ms. Altman, who is also caught in the device's beam, turns into a Skrull. When the Super-Skrull accuses her of being a traitor to her race, she responds by saying that the Empress ordered her to protect Teddy, even from the likes of the Super-Skrull, pulling out a gun. The Super-Skrull responds by killing her, though it was unintentional.

The Super-Skrull reveals that years ago during the Kree-Skrull War, he kidnapped Captain Mar-Vell, Quicksilver, and the Scarlet Witch, presenting them to the Skrull Emperor Dorrek VII. Though the heroes later escaped, the Emperor's daughter Princess Anelle conceived a child with Mar-Vell. At birth, the child was marked for death by Dorrek VII. His chambermaid smuggled him to Earth and raised him as Teddy.

The Super-Skrull reveals that his intention is to bring Teddy back to the Empire so that he may unify his people. Kree soldiers arrive to take Teddy as one of their own. A battle erupts between the Kree and the Skrull. Teddy ends the conflict by surrendering himself. It is settled that Teddy will spend half an Earth-year with the Kree and the other half with the Skrull, at which time he will declare his ultimate allegiance. The "Teddy" that left Earth is actually the Super-Skrull in disguise. The real Teddy remains on Earth.

Civil War

Along with the rest of his team, Hulkling sides with Secret Avengers against the Superhuman Registration Act during the Civil War storyline. He plays a pivotal role in Captain America's plan for the final confrontation with Iron Man's forces, impersonating Yellowjacket to free the imprisoned heroes of Prison 42.

Meeting Captain Marvel
Hulkling contacts the mysteriously revived Captain Marvel to confront him about his identity as Mar-Vell's son. Mar-Vell confirms the Super Skrull's story concerning Teddy's origins and that he could be Teddy's father, though he was unaware of Teddy's existence because he and the Skrull Princess Anelle never saw each other again. Mar-Vell comforts a frustrated Teddy, who is upset at Mar-Vell's intention to return to the past, expressing an interest in spending more time with him before he dies. Later, Teddy asserts that he never saw Mar-Vell alive again.

Teddy exhibits frustration with being essentially orphaned during the events of "Family Matters" and his hopes of establishing a father-son relationship with Mar-Vell, his last remaining parent. Later storylines reveal that the "revived" Captain Marvel that Teddy met was a Skrull imposter named Khn'nr, intended by Skrull scientists to impersonate the original Kree soldier. Due to some misprogramming, the Skrull actually believed himself to be Mar-Vell.

In the Children's Crusade: Young Avengers One Shot a future version of Teddy is shown to have taken up the mantle of Captain Marvel wearing a version of his father's classic costume with the white and green coloring of his original Kree uniform.

Secret Invasion

The Young Avengers confront a group of rampaging super-powered Skrulls. He tries to use his Skrull heritage to calm them but is instead battered down with energy blasts. It was revealed that Veranke and a few higher up in position of the invasion have specifically ordered Teddy's death, without informing the soldiers of his royal heritage, for fear that it could confuse and divide the loyalties of their soldiers. Teddy is saved from execution at the last second by Xavin. With the aid of Xavin, Speed and Wiccan, Hulkling survives an attack by X'iv, a Skrull assassin with the powers of Daredevil, Elektra, and Cloak and Dagger.

Later a Skrull reveals to Hulkling, Wiccan, and Hawkeye that taking over the Earth was the last chance they had since all their planets have been destroyed.

Original Sins
Hulkling is featured in the Original Sins mini-series as part of the Original Sin storyline. With his friends Marvel Boy (Noh-Varr) and Prodigy (David Alleyne), Hulkling tries to save innocent people from being overwhelmed by cosmic secrets that are driving them insane.

All-New, All-Different Marvel
As part of the All-New, All-Different Marvel event, Hulkling (alongside Wiccan) became a member of Sunspot's New Avengers. Eventually, a small group of Kree–Skrull hybrids arrive on Earth and kidnap Teddy so that he can assume his position as king and unite the two warring alien races. Teddy gains the sword of the prior king and uses it to defeat ghost wizard Moridun but announces that he has commitments to protect Earth and will return to fulfill his destiny if and when he is ready. Later, he manages to rescue Billy who was taken over by Moridun by convincing him to fight.

Empyre

Teddy later accepts his heritage and the mantle of "Dorrek VIII", and, at the cost of leaving Billy, becomes the new ruler of the Kree–Skrull Alliance, upon which he begins preparations to invade Earth for "the final war". This was further depicted when Raksor and Bel-Dann visit Teddy during his trip to Krakoa where they want him to bring the Kree and the Skrull to an alliance to combat a growing threat on the Moon. Their meeting is crashed by some Skrull soldiers that make up the Children of Lost Tarnax who called them heretics. A fight breaks out until Teddy becomes Hulkling and grabs the Sword of Space which frightens the remaining Children of Tarnax. Upon being beamed up to the Imperial Flagship, Hulkling meets with Tanalth the Translator who names him Dorrek VIII of the newly-founded Kree–Skrull Alliance. When Tanalth the Pursuer wants to deal with the Empyre's insurgency, Hulkling states that they should do a peace offering first. She then introduces the royal guards that will be working for Hulkling like Captain Glory and the Kree–Skrull sorceress M'ur-Ginn of the Knights of the Infinite. When the latest member is revealed to be Super-Skrull, Hulkling punches him for what he did to his mother. Super-Skrull stated that he actually slew the chambermaid that raised him after absconding him from Princess Anelle which he now regrets. After breaking up the argument, Tanalth the Pursuer explains that the Kree and Skrull fleets are proceeding to the Titan stargate near Saturn. He does suggest they make a stop first. Hulkling visits Mar-Vell's grave where he states that his mom has told him about his heroics. Though Hulkling had to break ties with Wiccan who states that he'll be on Earth when he returns.

As well as setting Hulkling up for the Empyre event, Lords of Empyre: Emperor Hulkling also shows the importance to Hulkling of his relationship with Wiccan. It was important to co-author Anthony Oliveira that the one-shot depict the everyday "queer life" that Hulkling lives and to expand on his character, who is often "left on the bench" while "Wiccan is off saving the world". Oliveira had previously shown the couple having a queer everyday life with Wiccan going to a drag brunch with Loki, with Hulkling largely lounging on the sofa at home, eating breakfast cereal from a bowl balanced on Excelsior, his Star Sword. The events of Emperor Hulkling start at a drag bar, where Hulkling is drinking with fellow Young Avengers Prodigy and Speed, who are also depicted as a couple. This one-shot, the Empyre series and the coda one-shot Empyre: Aftermath Avengers jointly won the GLAAD Media Award for Outstanding Comic Book on April 8, 2021.

Analogy to the Arthurian legend
Several comics showed stark similarities between Wiccan and Hulkling and the mythological figures Merlin and Arthur. 
Both Arthur (at least in one popular version of the legend) and Hulkling grew up unaware of their destiny. Both are prophesied to unite their people and bring peace, have a strong wizard on their side, use magical swords and become the beloved Kings of a big kingdom/empire.

The first time this connection was made, was when Hulkling was a member of A.I.M.. He was kidnapped by the "Knights of the Infinite", an analogy to the Arthurian "Knights of the Round Table" and told, that he was the prophesied ruler of the united Kree/Skrull Empire. He was then told to get a sword out of a light beam and announced "King of the space". That's an obvious adaptation of the famous Arthurian legend of the sword in the stone. Hulkling even named his sword "Excelsior", Arthur's sword was named "Excalibur". Two of the knights seem to be named after characters of the Arthurian Mythos, Lan-Zarr (after Lancelot), Mur-G'nn (after Morgana, also a Magic user). There is also M'ryn the Magus (named after Merlin), an old Magic user, who spoke the prophecy.

It is again heavily referenced during the Empyre event, Wiccan even says "Like Merlin? I'll take it!", after being crowned court wizard of the Kree/Skrull-Alliance.

Relationships
Exchanges between Wiccan (when Wiccan was known as Asgardian) and Hulkling (and the latter's character design) in early issues of Young Avengers led some readers to speculate that the two young men had a much more intimate bond than mere friendship. As early as Young Avengers #2, each issue's letters page included an exchange of reader opinions between people who supported and people who were against the portrayal of gay superheroes. Allan Heinberg confirmed this speculation at a San Diego Comic-Con panel, stating that his intent was to reveal the relationship in issue #12, and he was surprised that his subtle clues were picked up on so quickly.

In Young Avengers Special, the team agrees to give an interview to Kat Farrell and Jessica Jones, and warns Billy and Teddy that Farrell will probably ask if the rumors about them are true. After some deliberation, the two decide to tell her, referencing one of Marvel's most prominent gay superheroes when Teddy adds, "Why should Northstar have all the fun?"

In Cable & Deadpool #30, Deadpool is caught by Captain America's Secret Avengers, with whom the Young Avengers had merged. Deadpool, a typical breaker of the fourth wall, made a reference to Hulkling's and Wiccan's being gay by referring to the team as "...The Ripe, Nubile Young Avengers! And I'm especially discomfited to admit that Wiccan and Hulkling are looking especially nubile..."

In Avengers: The Children's Crusade #9, Teddy proposes to Billy and the two share their first on-panel kiss. They are married during Empyre.

In New Avengers, the hybrids refer to Teddy as King Dorrek VIII and Billy as his "prince consort". A flashforward to 20XX shows an older Billy and Teddy living happily together with a daughter, Katie.

Powers and abilities
Hulkling is the extraterrestrial hybrid offspring of an enhanced Kree warrior, Captain Marvel, and Skrull royalty, Princess Anelle, resulting in various abilities derived from the unique combination of his parents' genetic material. His powers exceed those of ordinary individuals of either race; they most likely are much stronger than those of other potential hybrids due to his father's various enhancements prior to Hulkling's conception. His shape-shifting and accelerated healing factor derive from his Skrull heritage, while his superhuman strength originates from his enhanced Kree background.

His shape-shifting abilities allow him to impersonate others, independently alter parts of his body, and manifest different physical abilities. For example, he can form claws, extend his reach, create body armor, and grow wings (which enable him to fly). Hulkling can use his shapeshifting to increase his body's density and composition, giving him a very strong resistance to pain and injury. He is able to withstand great impact forces, such as falls from great heights, repeated bludgeoning from superhumanly strong beings, and powerful energy blasts without sustaining injury. High caliber bullets and bladed weapons are also unable to pierce his skin. Hulkling's shapeshifting also demonstrated the ability to operate without his conscious thought to protect himself from injury; his body shifted its biomass to protect vital organs, while the Warden of The Cube was attempting to vivisect him in Civil War: Young Avengers/Runaways.

His healing factor allows him to heal wounds quickly, but not on a scale with Wolverine or Hulk. Hulkling's alien anatomy also prevents him from being controlled by pheromone-based powers, such as those used by Daken.

In recent stories Teddy has come into possession of Excelsior, a mystical cosmic sword owned by his ancestor Dorrek Supreme, which only passes down to those of Dorrek's line. Its wielder, as unmitigated ruler of both Kree and Skrull and Lord of the Knights of Infinity, is entitled to inherit rulership of the entire cosmos. Its skin alone has arcane abilities such as negating and absorbing magic as well as canceling out eldritch entities (i.e., an entity from the universe before the present one) using its knife edge. In two comics written by Anthony Oliveira, Hulkling is also shown (mis)using Excelsior as background furniture — in Drag Brunch with Loki, Hulkling is depicted eating breakfast cereal using Excelsior as a table; in Emperor Hulkling, Excelsior is leaning against his nightstand, with a dirty sock hanging over the hilt.

Reception

Critical reception 
Heinberg reported that when the relationship between Hulkling and Wiccan was initially suspected before its confirmation, most fans were supportive, with minimal negative reaction. Hulkling and Wiccan have been called "Marvel's most prominent gay couple," and received praise for showing diversity and progression in comics. While accepting the Corporate Vanguard Award for Marvel Entertainment at the Los Angeles LGBT Center, Marvel's VP of Animation Development, Cort Lane, cited Hulkling and Wiccan's relationship as one of his favorite story lines featuring LGBT characters.

Andrew Wheeler of ComicsAlliance wrote, "Something about the sweetness of the love between Hulkling and Wiccan, aka Billy and Teddy, has struck a strong chord with readers looking for a little romance to melt their hearts. After dealing with time travellers, alien invasions and mad mutants, their story stands out as an It Gets Better for the superhero set." M.N Negus of CBR.com referred to Hulkling and Wiccan as "one of Marvel's most iconic LGBT+ couples," writing, "Wiccan and Hulkling have been together for nearly two decades, and are now living happily ever after. Their recent exploits are depicted in Hulkling and Wiccan Infinity Comic #1 (by writer Josh Trujillo and artists Jodi Nishijima, Matt Milla, and VC's Ariana Maher), in which they even explore a life without the other. Throughout their struggles as individuals and as a couple, they manage to come out on top with their bond becoming stronger than before. Their coupling has withstood the test of time and truly become an iconic development in Marvel comic books." Eric Diaz of Nerdist stated, "Marvel Comics took a big and necessary step into the 21st century today, as they announced the very first marriage between two LGBTQ superheroes will soon take place in their pages. The event occurs in Empyre: Avengers Aftermath #1, which will feature the union of longtime superhero couple Hulkling and Wiccan. Both heroes are famous for being founding members of the Young Avengers."

Accolades 

 In 2012, ComicsAlliance ranked Hulkling and Wiccan 6th in their " "50 Comics and Characters that Resonate with LGBT Readers" list.
 In 2018, Nerdist included Hulkling in their "12 Avengers from the Comics Who We'd Still Love to See on the Big Screen" list.
 In 2019, CBR.com ranked Hulkling 4th in their "The 5 Most Powerful Young Avengers (& The 5 Weakest)" list.
 In 2020, CBR.com ranked Hulkling 1st in their "Marvel Comics: 10 Most Powerful Teen Heroes In Marvel Comics" list.
 In 2021, Screen Rant ranked Hulkling and Wiccan 2nd in their "10 Best Relationships in Avengers Comics" list and ranked Hukling 2nd in their "10 Most Powerful Members Of The Young Avengers" list.
 In 2022, CBR.com ranked Hulkling and Wiccan 5th in their "10 Best Marvel Couples" list and 7th in their "10 Healthiest Marvel Couples" list.

Literary reception

Volumes

Hulkling & Wiccan - 2022 
Hannah Rose of CBR.com called Hulkling and Wiccan #1 an "interesting love story," writing, "Instead of budding romance, it tells the story of a pair of newly-weds who have known each other for quite a while. By the time this story begins, Hulkling and Wiccan are already enjoying domestic bliss. But before they can settle into life as a married couple, they're forced to adjust to the responsibilities of their new royal positions. It's clear from their serious discussions and their playful banter that these two care for each other. But, Hulkling and Wiccan #1 reminds the audience that Teddy and Billy are both very young, very insecure, and very uncertain about their place in space. Their arguments and insecurities are realistically and excellently written." Jenna Anderson of Comicbook.com gave Hulkling and Wiccan #1 a grade of 3 out of 5, saying, "One of the most beloved LGBTQ+ couples in Marvel's arsenal gets the spotlight again, with a one-shot (reprinting the first portion of the digital Infinity Comic of the same name) that puts Wiccan and Hulkling's newfound married life to the test. To say any more beyond that would spoil (and probably complicate) the specifics of what is laid out, with the two being put through a crucible that will only make them further realize their bond. Some fans of the couple will surely love it, while some won't — but there's definitely a fun sense of artistry on display, particularly with Jodi Nishijima's art and Matt Milla's dreamy colors. Diehard fans of Billy and Teddy will surely want to add this to their collection, but this isn't a must-read on a larger level."

Other versions

Avengers Fairy Tales
In the one-shot Avengers Fairy Tales, Hulkling appears as The Hatter in an adaptation of Alice's Adventures in Wonderland.

Earth-A

Hulkling is one of the 142 superhumans who are registered, implying he had joined the Initiative. Hulkling is seen briefly in Camp Hammond. However, this version of Hulkling was from another dimension who later returned to Earth-A, and the real Hulkling remains unregistered.

Earth-15061
On Earth-15061 (which takes place in an alternate future in the year 20XX), Dorrek VIII is a member of that reality's version of the Avengers under the name "King Hulk".

Marvel Zombies
Hulkling is seen briefly in the Marvel Zombies vs. The Army of Darkness mini-series. While Ashley G. Williams is trying to save the city, he confronts a zombified Hulkling. With little effort, he chainsaws off his arms and head, and destroys the zombie.

In other media

Video games
 Hulkling appears in Lego Marvel's Avengers and in Lego Marvel Super Heroes 2, voiced by Scott Whyte.
 Hulkling appears in Marvel: Future Fight.
 Hulkling appeared as a recruitable character in Marvel Avengers Academy, during the "Young Avengers" event.
 In June 2022, Hulkling became available as a playable character in Marvel Puzzle Quest  and Marvel Contest of Champions.

See also
 LGBT themes in comics

References

External links
 Hulkling at Marvel.com
 Hulkling at Marvel Wiki
 Gay League Profile

Avengers (comics) characters
Comics characters introduced in 2005
Galactic emperors
Fictional energy swordfighters
Fictional gay males
Fictional swordfighters in comics
Kree
Marvel Comics characters who are shapeshifters
Marvel Comics characters with accelerated healing
Marvel Comics characters with superhuman strength
Marvel Comics extraterrestrial superheroes
Marvel Comics hybrids
Marvel Comics LGBT superheroes
Marvel Comics male superheroes
Marvel Comics orphans
Skrull
Characters created by Allan Heinberg
Teenage superheroes